The Anne River is a perennial river located in the south-west region of Tasmania, Australia. At  in length, the Anne River is extremely steep and flows through parts of the Tasmanian Wilderness World Heritage Area.

Location and features
With no significant tributaries, the Anne River reaches its confluence with the Huon River in remote wilderness country. The river descends  over its  course.

The Anne River is a remote wilderness area, visited by avid bushwalkers. The river has only been navigated on a few occasions by kayakers.

See also

List of rivers of Tasmania

References

Rivers of Tasmania
Lists of coordinates
Western Tasmania
South West Tasmania